Geoff Harrold (born 20 July 1953) is a former Australian rules footballer who played with Melbourne in the Victorian Football League (VFL).

Notes

External links 

1953 births
Living people
Australian rules footballers from Victoria (Australia)
Melbourne Football Club players